Scopula amala is a moth of the family Geometridae. It was described by Edward Meyrick in 1886. It is found on New Guinea and Australia.

References

Moths described in 1886
amala
Moths of Australia
Moths of New Guinea
Taxa named by Edward Meyrick